This is a list of members of the European Parliament for the Netherlands in the 1999 to 2004 session, ordered by name and by party.

Party representation

Mutations

1999
 10 June: Election for the European Parliament in the Netherlands.
 20 July: Beginning of the 5th European Parliament session. (1999–2004)

2001
 2 October: Jan-Kees Wiebenga (VVD) leaves the European Parliament, because he became a member of the Dutch Council of State.
 12 November: Herman Vermeer (VVD) is installed in the European Parliament as a replacement for Jan-Kees Wiebenga

2003
 30 January: Lousewies van der Laan (D66) leaves the European Parliament, taking her seat in the Dutch Parliament after the 2002 Dutch general election.
 5 February: Johanna Boogerd-Quaak (D66) is installed in the European Parliament as a replacement for Lousewies van der Laan
 27 May: Karla Peijs (CDA) leaves the European Parliament, because she became a minister in the Second Balkenende cabinet.
 11 June: Peter Pex (CDA) is installed in the European Parliament as a replacement for Karla Peijs
 1 October: Hanja Maij-Weggen (CDA) leaves the European Parliament, because she became a King's Commissioner in North Brabant.
 8 October: Cees Bremmer (CDA) is installed in the European Parliament as a replacement for Hanja Maij-Weggen

Alphabetical

| style="text-align:left;" colspan="11" | 
|-
! Name
! Sex
! National party
! EP Group
! Period
! Preference vote
|-
| style="text-align:left;" | Bas Belder
| style="text-align:left;" | Male
| style="text-align:left;" |  Reformed Political Party
| style="text-align:left;" |  EDD
| style="text-align:left;" | 20 July 1999 – 2 July 2019
| style="text-align:left;" | 20,491
|-
| style="text-align:left;" | Max van den Berg
| style="text-align:left;" | Male
| style="text-align:left;" |  Labour Party
| style="text-align:left;" |  PES
| style="text-align:left;" | 20 July 1999 – 1 September 2007
| style="text-align:left;" | 584,167
|-
| style="text-align:left;" | Hans Blokland
| style="text-align:left;" | Male
| style="text-align:left;" |  Reformed Political Alliance
| style="text-align:left;" |  EDD
| style="text-align:left;" | 19 July 1994 – 14 July 2009
| style="text-align:left;" | 245,214
|-
| style="text-align:left;" | Johanna Boogerd-Quaak
| style="text-align:left;" | Female
| style="text-align:left;" |  Democrats 66
| style="text-align:left;" |  ELDR
| style="text-align:left;" | 5 February 2003 – 20 July 2004
| style="text-align:left;" | 10,992
|-
| style="text-align:left;" | Bob van den Bos
| style="text-align:left;" | Male
| style="text-align:left;" |  Democrats 66
| style="text-align:left;" |  ELDR
| style="text-align:left;" | 20 July 1999 – 20 July 2004
| style="text-align:left;" | 8,712
|-
| style="text-align:left;" | Theo Bouwman
| style="text-align:left;" | Male
| style="text-align:left;" |  GreenLeft
| style="text-align:left;" |  G–EFA
| style="text-align:left;" | 20 July 1999 – 20 July 2004
| style="text-align:left;" | 6,012
|-
| style="text-align:left;" | Cees Bremmer
| style="text-align:left;" | Male
| style="text-align:left;" |  Christian Democratic Appeal
| style="text-align:left;" |  EPP–ED
| style="text-align:left;" | 8 October 2003 – 20 July 2004
| style="text-align:left;" | 2,956
|-
| style="text-align:left;" | Kathalijne Buitenweg
| style="text-align:left;" | Female
| style="text-align:left;" |  GreenLeft
| style="text-align:left;" |  G–EFA
| style="text-align:left;" | 20 July 1999 – 14 July 2009
| style="text-align:left;" | 90,549
|-
| style="text-align:left;" | Ieke van den Burg
| style="text-align:left;" | Female
| style="text-align:left;" |  Labour Party
| style="text-align:left;" |  PES
| style="text-align:left;" | 20 July 1999 – 14 July 2009
| style="text-align:left;" | 55,016
|-
| style="text-align:left;" | Dorette Corbey
| style="text-align:left;" | Female
| style="text-align:left;" |  Labour Party
| style="text-align:left;" |  PES
| style="text-align:left;" | 20 July 1999 – 14 July 2009
| style="text-align:left;" | 4,898
|-
| style="text-align:left;" | Rijk van Dam
| style="text-align:left;" | Male
| style="text-align:left;" |  Reformatory Political Federation
| style="text-align:left;" |  EDD
| style="text-align:left;" | September 1997 – 20 July 2004
| style="text-align:left;" | 10,630
|-
| style="text-align:left;" | Bert Doorn
| style="text-align:left;" | Male
| style="text-align:left;" |  Christian Democratic Appeal
| style="text-align:left;" |  EPP–ED
| style="text-align:left;" | 20 July 1999 – 14 July 2009
| style="text-align:left;" | 3,598
|-
| style="text-align:left;" | Elly Plooij-van Gorsel
| style="text-align:left;" | Female
| style="text-align:left;" |  People's Party for Freedom and Democracy
| style="text-align:left;" |  ELDR
| style="text-align:left;" | 19 July 1994 – 20 July 2004
| style="text-align:left;" | 45,855
|-
| style="text-align:left;" | Marieke Sanders-ten Holte
| style="text-align:left;" | Female
| style="text-align:left;" |  People's Party for Freedom and Democracy
| style="text-align:left;" |  ELDR
| style="text-align:left;" | 20 July 1999 – 20 July 2004
| style="text-align:left;" | 45,855
|-
| style="text-align:left;" | Michiel van Hulten
| style="text-align:left;" | Male
| style="text-align:left;" |  Labour Party
| style="text-align:left;" |  PES
| style="text-align:left;" | 20 July 1999 – 20 July 2004
| style="text-align:left;" | 5,710
|-
| style="text-align:left;" | Lousewies van der Laan
| style="text-align:left;" | Female
| style="text-align:left;" |  Democrats 66
| style="text-align:left;" |  ELDR
| style="text-align:left;" | 20 July 1999 – 30 January 2003
| style="text-align:left;" | 143,009
|-
| style="text-align:left;" | Joost Lagendijk
| style="text-align:left;" | Male
| style="text-align:left;" |  GreenLeft
| style="text-align:left;" |  G–EFA
| style="text-align:left;" | 1 September 1998 – 14 July 2009
| style="text-align:left;" | 245,642
|-
| style="text-align:left;" | Albert Jan Maat
| style="text-align:left;" | Male
| style="text-align:left;" |  Christian Democratic Appeal
| style="text-align:left;" |  EPP–ED
| style="text-align:left;" | 20 July 1999 – 10 April 2007
| style="text-align:left;" | 34,622
|-
| style="text-align:left;" | Jules Maaten
| style="text-align:left;" | Male
| style="text-align:left;" |  People's Party for Freedom and Democracy
| style="text-align:left;" |  ELDR
| style="text-align:left;" | 20 July 1999 – 14 July 2009
| style="text-align:left;" | 4,341
|-
| style="text-align:left;" | Hanja Maij-Weggen
| style="text-align:left;" | Female
| style="text-align:left;" |  Christian Democratic Appeal
| style="text-align:left;" |  EPP–ED
| style="text-align:left;" | 19 July 1994 – 1 October 2003
| style="text-align:left;" | 591,505
|-
| style="text-align:left;" | Toine Manders
| style="text-align:left;" | Male
| style="text-align:left;" |  People's Party for Freedom and Democracy
| style="text-align:left;" |  ELDR
| style="text-align:left;" | 20 July 1999 – 1 July 20142 July 2019 – Present
| style="text-align:left;" | 14,237
|-
| style="text-align:left;" | Maria Martens
| style="text-align:left;" | Female
| style="text-align:left;" |  Christian Democratic Appeal
| style="text-align:left;" |  EPP–ED
| style="text-align:left;" | 20 July 1999 – 14 July 2009
| style="text-align:left;" | 16,254
|-
| style="text-align:left;" | Erik Meijer
| style="text-align:left;" | Male
| style="text-align:left;" |  Socialist Party
| style="text-align:left;" |  EUL–NGL
| style="text-align:left;" | 20 July 1999 – 14 July 2009
| style="text-align:left;" | 124,800
|-
| style="text-align:left;" | Jan Mulder
| style="text-align:left;" | Male
| style="text-align:left;" |  People's Party for Freedom and Democracy
| style="text-align:left;" |  ELDR
| style="text-align:left;" | 19 July 1994 – 14 July 2009  22 June 2010 – 1 July 2014
| style="text-align:left;" | 13,825
|-
| style="text-align:left;" | Ria Oomen-Ruijten
| style="text-align:left;" | Female
| style="text-align:left;" |  Christian Democratic Appeal
| style="text-align:left;" |  EPP–ED
| style="text-align:left;" | 25 July 1989 – 1 July 2014
| style="text-align:left;" | 99,584
|-
| style="text-align:left;" | Arie Oostlander
| style="text-align:left;" | Male
| style="text-align:left;" |  Christian Democratic Appeal
| style="text-align:left;" |  EPP–ED
| style="text-align:left;" | 25 July 1989 – 20 July 2004
| style="text-align:left;" | 17,628
|-
| style="text-align:left;" | Karla Peijs
| style="text-align:left;" | Female
| style="text-align:left;" |  Christian Democratic Appeal
| style="text-align:left;" |  EPP–ED
| style="text-align:left;" | 25 July 1989 – 27 May 2003
| style="text-align:left;" | 11,975
|-
| style="text-align:left;" | Peter Pex
| style="text-align:left;" | Male
| style="text-align:left;" |  Christian Democratic Appeal
| style="text-align:left;" |  EPP–ED
| style="text-align:left;" | 11 June 2003 – 20 July 2004
| style="text-align:left;" | 8,380
|-
| style="text-align:left;" | Bartho Pronk
| style="text-align:left;" | Male
| style="text-align:left;" |  Christian Democratic Appeal
| style="text-align:left;" |  EPP–ED
| style="text-align:left;" | 20 November 1989 – 20 July 2004
| style="text-align:left;" | 7,929
|-
| style="text-align:left;" | Alexander de Roo
| style="text-align:left;" | Male
| style="text-align:left;" |  GreenLeft
| style="text-align:left;" |  G–EFA
| style="text-align:left;" | 20 July 1999 – 20 July 2004
| style="text-align:left;" | 4,343
|-
| style="text-align:left;" | Joke Swiebel
| style="text-align:left;" | Female
| style="text-align:left;" |  Labour Party
| style="text-align:left;" |  PES
| style="text-align:left;" | 20 July 1999 – 20 July 2004
| style="text-align:left;" | 12,554
|-
| style="text-align:left;" | Wim van Velzen
| style="text-align:left;" | Male
| style="text-align:left;" |  Christian Democratic Appeal
| style="text-align:left;" |  EPP–ED
| style="text-align:left;" | 19 July 1994 – 20 July 2004
| style="text-align:left;" | 103,743
|-
| style="text-align:left;" | Herman Vermeer
| style="text-align:left;" | Male
| style="text-align:left;" |  People's Party for Freedom and Democracy
| style="text-align:left;" |  ELDR
| style="text-align:left;" | 12 November 2001 – 20 July 2004
| style="text-align:left;" | 6,535
|-
| style="text-align:left;" | Jan-Kees Wiebenga
| style="text-align:left;" | Male
| style="text-align:left;" |  People's Party for Freedom and Democracy
| style="text-align:left;" |  ELDR
| style="text-align:left;" | 19 July 1994 – October 2001
| style="text-align:left;" | 535,904
|-
| style="text-align:left;" | Jan Marinus Wiersma
| style="text-align:left;" | Male
| style="text-align:left;" |  Labour Party
| style="text-align:left;" |  PES
| style="text-align:left;" | 19 July 1994 – 14 July 2009
| style="text-align:left;" | 9,753
|-style="background-color:#dcdcdc"
| style="text-align:left;" colspan="7" |Source:
|-
|}

By party

On the Christian Democratic Appeal list: (EPP-ED)

 Albert Jan Maat
 Maria Martens
 Bert Doorn
 Hanja Maij-Weggen (top candidate) (replaced by: Cees Bremmer)
 Wim van Velzen
 Bartho Pronk
 Arie Oostlander
 Karla Peijs (replaced by: Peter Pex)
 Ria Oomen-Ruijten
 Peter Pex
 Cees Bremmer

On the Labour Party list: (PES)

 Michiel van Hulten
 Joke Swiebel
 Ieke van den Burg
 Dorette Corbey
 Max van den Berg (top candidate)
 Jan Marinus Wiersma

On the People's Party for Freedom and Democracy list: (ELDR)

 Jules Maaten
 Toine Manders
 Jan Mulder
 Elly Plooij-van Gorsel
 Marieke Sanders-ten Holte
 Jan-Kees Wiebenga (top candidate) (replaced by: Herman Vermeer)
 Herman Vermeer

On the GreenLeft list: (Greens-EFA)

 Theo Bouwman
 Kathalijne Buitenweg
 Joost Lagendijk (top candidate)
 Alexander de Roo

On the SGP, GPV and RPF list: (EDD)

 Bas Belder (SGP)
 Hans Blokland (GPV) (top candidate)
 Rijk van Dam (RPF)

On the Democrats 66 list: (ELDR)

 Lousewies van der Laan (top candidate) (replaced by: Johanna Boogerd-Quaak)
 Bob van den Bos
 Johanna Boogerd-Quaak

On the Socialist Party list: (EUL/NGL)

 Erik Meijer

References

1999
Netherlands
List